Consort Gong may refer to:

Empress Dowager Gong (died 562), Xiao Tong's concubine and Xiao Cha's mother
Queen Soheon (1395–1446), wife of Sejong the Great
Royal Consort Gongbin Choe ( 1462), concubine of the future Yejong of Joseon
Royal Noble Consort Gongbin Kim (1553–1577), consort of Seonjo of Joseon
Empress Dowager Wang (Taichang) (1565–1611), concubine of the Wanli Emperor

See also
Empress Gong (died 452), consort of Tuoba Huang